That's My Baby! is a 1984 Canadian comedy film directed by John Bradshaw and Edie Yolles. It was distributed for a brief time by Troma Entertainment.

The film follows a couple, Lewis and Suzanne: Lewis takes care of the house and works part-time, while Suzanne works full-time. Lewis decides he wants a child, but Suzanne worries that it might interfere with her career.

External links

1984 films
1984 comedy films
Canadian independent films
Troma Entertainment films
English-language Canadian films
Canadian comedy films
Films scored by Eric Robertson (composer)
Films directed by John Bradshaw (director)
1980s English-language films
1980s Canadian films